Demetrio Camarda (Arbërisht: Dhimitër Kamarda; 22 October 1821, in Piana degli Albanesi – 13 March 1882, in Livorno) was an Arbëreshë linguist, patriot of the Arbëreshë, and publisher of Albanian folklore, with scientific knowledge also in the field of Indo-European linguistics.

Camarda, along with Girolamo De Rada were the main two initiators of the Italo-Albanian (Arbëreshë) cultural movement in Italy during the second half of the 19th century. He was the follower of the literary work already performed by Jeronim De Rada. His main work, Test of Comparative Grammar on Albanian Language is the first scientific work of comparative historic study on the topic. He made an important contribution with the publication of The Albanian general alphabet in 1869.

References

Linguists from Italy
Arbëreshë people
1821 births
1882 deaths
People from Piana degli Albanesi
Albanian-language writers